In Cook Islands mythology, Marama was a male lunar deity, who loved Ina, the goddess of light. She married Marama and lives in the sky during the daytime and rarely sees her husband.

See also
 List of lunar deities

References

Cook Islands mythology
Lunar gods